French cinema consists of the film industry and its film productions, whether made within the nation of France or by French film production companies abroad. It is the oldest and largest precursor of national cinemas in Europe; with primary influence also on the creation of national cinemas in Asia.

France continues to have a particularly strong film industry, due in part to protections afforded by the French government. In 2013, France was the second largest exporter of films in the world after the United States. A study in April 2014 showed that French cinema maintains a positive influence around the world, being the most appreciated by global audiences after that of America.

France currently has the most successful film industry in Europe, in terms of number of films produced per annum, with a record-breaking 300 feature-length films produced in 2015. France is also one of the few countries where non-American productions have the biggest share: American films only represented 44.9% of total admissions in 2014. This is largely due to the commercial strength of domestic productions, which accounted for 44.5% of admissions in 2014 (35.5% in 2015; 35.3% in 2016). The French film industry is closer to being entirely self-sufficient than any other country in Europe, recovering around 80–90% of costs from revenues generated in the domestic market alone.

Apart from its strong and innovative film tradition, France has also been a leading destination for filmmakers and actors from around the world; consequently, French cinema is sometimes intertwined with the cinema of foreign nations. Directors from nations such as Poland (Roman Polanski, Krzysztof Kieślowski, and Andrzej Żuławski), Argentina (Gaspar Noé and Edgardo Cozarinsky), Russia (Alexandre Alexeieff, Anatole Litvak), Austria (Michael Haneke), and Georgia (Géla Babluani, Otar Iosseliani) are prominent in the ranks of French cinema. Conversely, French directors have had prolific and influential careers in other countries, such as Luc Besson, Jacques Tourneur, or Francis Veber in the United States. 

Paris has the highest density of cinemas in the world, measured by the number of movie theaters per inhabitant, and that in most "downtown Paris" movie theaters, foreign movies which would be secluded to "art houses" cinemas in other places are shown alongside "mainstream" works. Philippe Binant realized, on 2 February 2000, the first digital cinema projection in Europe, with the DLP CINEMA technology developed by Texas Instruments, in Paris. Paris also boasts the Cité du cinéma, a major studio north of the city, and Disney Studio, a theme park devoted to the cinema and the third theme park near the city behind Disneyland and Parc Asterix.

A favorite theme has been the French Revolution, with hundreds of titles.

History 

Les frères Lumière released the first projection with the Cinematograph, in Paris on 28 December 1895. The French film industry in the late 19th century and early 20th century was the world's most important. Auguste and Louis Lumière invented the cinématographe and their L'Arrivée d'un train en gare de La Ciotat in Paris in 1895 is considered by many historians as the official birth of cinematography. French films during this period catered to a growing middle class and were mostly shown in cafés and traveling fairs.

The early days of the industry, from 1896 to 1902, saw the dominance of four firms: Pathé Frères, the Gaumont Film Company, the Georges Méliès company, and the Lumières. Méliès invented many of the techniques of cinematic grammar, and among his fantastic, surreal short subjects is the first science fiction film A Trip to the Moon (Le Voyage dans la Lune) in 1902.

In 1902, the Lumières abandoned everything but the production of film stock, leaving Méliès as the weakest player of the remaining three. (He would retire in 1914.) From 1904 to 1911, the Pathé Frères company led the world in film production and distribution.

At Gaumont, pioneer Alice Guy-Blaché (M. Gaumont's former secretary) was made head of production and oversaw about 400 films, from her first, La Fée aux Choux, in 1896, through 1906. She then continued her career in the United States, as did Maurice Tourneur and Léonce Perret after World War I.

In 1907, Gaumont owned and operated the biggest movie studio in the world, and along with the boom in construction of "luxury cinemas" like the Gaumont-Palace and the Pathé-Palace (both 1911), cinema became an economic challenger to theater by 1914.

After World War I 
After World War I, the French film industry suffered because of a lack of capital, and film production decreased as it did in most other European countries. This allowed the United States film industry to enter the European cinema market, because American films could be sold more cheaply than European productions, since the studios already had recouped their costs in the home market. When film studios in Europe began to fail, many European countries began to set import barriers. France installed an import quota of 1:7, meaning for every seven foreign films imported to France, one French film was to be produced and shown in French cinemas.

During the period between World War I and World War II, Jacques Feyder and Jean Vigo became two of the founders of poetic realism in French cinema. They also dominated French impressionist cinema, along with Abel Gance, Germaine Dulac and Jean Epstein.

In 1931, Marcel Pagnol filmed the first of his great trilogy Marius, Fanny, and César. He followed this with other films including The Baker's Wife. Other notable films of the 1930s included René Clair's Under the Roofs of Paris (1930), Jean Vigo's L'Atalante (1934), Jacques Feyder's Carnival in Flanders (1935), and Julien Duvivier's La belle equipe (1936). In 1935, renowned playwright and actor Sacha Guitry directed his first film and went on to make more than 30 films that were precursors to the New Wave era. In 1937, Jean Renoir, the son of painter Pierre-Auguste Renoir, directed La Grande Illusion (The Grand Illusion). In 1939, Renoir directed La Règle du Jeu (The Rules of the Game). Several critics have cited this film as one of the greatest of all-time, particularly for its innovative camerawork, cinematography and sound editing.

Marcel Carné's Les Enfants du Paradis (Children of Paradise) was filmed during World War II and released in 1945. The three-hour film was extremely difficult to make due to the Nazi occupation. Set in Paris in 1828, it was voted Best French Film of the Century in a poll of 600 French critics and professionals in the late 1990s.

Post–World War II

1940s–1970s 

In the magazine Cahiers du cinéma, founded by André Bazin and two other writers in 1951, film critics raised the level of discussion of the cinema, providing a platform for the birth of modern film theory. Several of the Cahiers critics, including Jean-Luc Godard, François Truffaut, Claude Chabrol, Jacques Rivette and Éric Rohmer, went on to make films themselves, creating what was to become known as the French New Wave. Some of the first films of this new movement were Godard's Breathless (À bout de souffle, 1960), starring Jean-Paul Belmondo, Rivette's Paris Belongs to Us (Paris nous appartient, 1958 – distributed in 1961), starring Jean-Claude Brialy and Truffaut's The 400 Blows (Les Quatre Cent Coups, 1959) starring Jean-Pierre Léaud. Later works are Contempt (1963) by Godard starring Brigitte Bardot and Michel Piccoli and Stolen Kisses starring Léaud and Claude Jade. Because Truffaut followed the hero of his screen debut, Antoine Doinel, for twenty years, the last post-New-Wave-film is Love on the Run in which his heroes Antoine (Léaud) and Christine (Jade) get divorced.

Many contemporaries of Godard and Truffaut followed suit, or achieved international critical acclaim with styles of their own, such as the minimalist films of Robert Bresson and Jean-Pierre Melville, the Hitchcockian-like thrillers of Henri-Georges Clouzot, and other New Wave films by Agnès Varda and Alain Resnais. The movement, while an inspiration to other national cinemas and unmistakably a direct influence on the future New Hollywood directors, slowly faded by the end of the 1960s.

During this period, French commercial film also made a name for itself. Immensely popular French comedies with Louis de Funès topped the French box office. The war comedy La Grande Vadrouille (1966), from Gérard Oury with Bourvil and Terry-Thomas, was the most successful film in French theaters for more than 30 years. Another example was La Folie des grandeurs with Yves Montand. French cinema also was the birthplace for many subgenres of the crime film, most notably the modern caper film, starting with 1955's Rififi by American-born director Jules Dassin and followed by a large number of serious, noirish heist dramas as well as playful caper comedies throughout the sixties, and the "polar," a typical French blend of film noir and detective fiction.

In addition, French movie stars began to claim fame abroad as well as at home. Popular actors of the period included Brigitte Bardot, Alain Delon, Romy Schneider, Catherine Deneuve, Jeanne Moreau, Simone Signoret, Yves Montand, Jean-Paul Belmondo and still Jean Gabin.

Since the Sixties and the early Seventies they are completed and followed by Michel Piccoli and Philippe Noiret as character actors, Annie Girardot, Jean-Louis Trintignant, Jean-Pierre Léaud, Claude Jade, Isabelle Huppert, Anny Duperey, Gérard Depardieu, Patrick Dewaere, Jean-Pierre Cassel, Miou-Miou, Brigitte Fossey, Stéphane Audran and Isabelle Adjani. During the Eightees they are added by a new generation including Sophie Marceau, Emmanuelle Béart, Jean-Hugues Anglade, Sabine Azema, Juliette Binoche and Daniel Auteuil.

The 1979 film La Cage aux Folles ran for well over a year at the Paris Theatre, an arthouse cinema in New York City, and was a commercial success at theaters throughout the country, in both urban and rural areas. It won the Golden Globe Award for Best Foreign Language Film, and for years it remained the most successful foreign film to be released in the United States.

1980s 
Jean-Jacques Beineix's Diva (1981) sparked the beginning of the 1980s wave of French cinema. Movies which followed in its wake included Betty Blue (37°2 le matin, 1986) by Beineix, The Big Blue (Le Grand bleu, 1988) by Luc Besson, and The Lovers on the Bridge (Les Amants du Pont-Neuf, 1991) by Léos Carax. These films, made with a slick commercial style and emphasizing the alienation of their main characters, was known as Cinema du look.

Camille Claudel, directed by newcomer Bruno Nuytten and starring Isabelle Adjani and Gérard Depardieu, was a major commercial success in 1988, earning Adjani, who was also the film's co-producer, a César Award for best actress. The historical drama film Jean de Florette (1986) and its sequel Manon des Sources (1986) were among the highest grossing French films in history and brought Daniel Auteuil international recognition.

According to Raphaël Bassan, in his article «The Angel: Un météore dans le ciel de l'animation,» La Revue du cinéma, n° 393, avril 1984. , Patrick Bokanowski's The Angel, shown in 1982 at the Cannes Film Festival, can be considered the beginnings of contemporary animation. The masks erase all human personality in the characters. Patrick Bokanowski would thus have total control over the "matter" of the image and its optical composition. This is especially noticeable throughout the film, with images taken through distorted objectives or a plastic work on the sets and costumes, for example in the scene of the designer. Patrick Bokanowski creates his own universe and obeys his own aesthetic logic. It takes us through a series of distorted areas, obscure visions, metamorphoses and synthetic objects. Indeed, in the film, the human may be viewed as a fetish object (for example, the doll hanging by a thread), with reference to Kafkaesque and Freudian theories on automata and the fear of man faced with something as complex as him. The ascent of the stairs would be the liberation of the ideas of death, culture, and sex that makes us reach the emblematic figure of the angel.

1990s 

Jean-Paul Rappeneau's Cyrano de Bergerac was a major box-office success in 1990, earning several César Awards, including best actor for Gérard Depardieu, as well as an Academy Award nomination for best foreign picture.

Luc Besson made La Femme Nikita in 1990, a movie that inspired remakes in both United States and in Hong Kong. In 1994, he also made Léon (starring Jean Reno and a young Natalie Portman), and in 1997 The Fifth Element, which became a cult favorite and launched the career of Milla Jovovich.

Jean-Pierre Jeunet made Delicatessen and The City of Lost Children (La Cité des enfants perdus), both of which featured a distinctly fantastical style.

In 1992, Claude Sautet co-wrote (with Jacques Fieschi) and directed Un Coeur en Hiver, considered by many to be a masterpiece. Mathieu Kassovitz's 1995 film Hate (La Haine) received critical praise and made Vincent Cassel a star, and in 1997, Juliette Binoche won the Academy Award for Best Supporting Actress for her role in The English Patient.

The success of Michel Ocelot's Kirikou and the Sorceress in 1998 rejuvenated the production of original feature-length animated films by such filmmakers as Jean-François Laguionie and Sylvain Chomet.

2000s 

In 2000, Philippe Binant realized the first digital cinema projection in Europe, with the DLP CINEMA technology developed by Texas Instruments, in Paris.

In 2001, after a brief stint in Hollywood, Jean-Pierre Jeunet returned to France with Amélie (Le Fabuleux Destin d'Amélie Poulain) starring Audrey Tautou. It became the highest-grossing French-language film ever released in the United States. The following year, Brotherhood of the Wolf became the second-highest-grossing French-language film in the United States since 1980 and went on to gross more than $70 million worldwide.

In 2008, Marion Cotillard won the Academy Award for Best Actress and the BAFTA Award for Best Actress in a Leading Role for her portrayal of legendary French singer Édith Piaf in La Vie en Rose, the first French-language performance to be so honored. The film won two Oscars and four BAFTAs and became the third-highest-grossing French-language film in the United States since 1980. Cotillard was the first female and second person to win both an Academy Award and César Award for the same performance.

At the 2008 Cannes Film Festival, Entre les murs (The Class) won the Palme d'Or, the 6th French victory at the festival. The 2000s also saw an increase in the number of individual competitive awards won by French artists at the Cannes Festival, for direction (Tony Gatlif, Exils, 2004), screenplay (Agnès Jaoui and Jean-Pierre Bacri, Look at Me, 2004), female acting (Isabelle Huppert, The Piano Teacher, 2001; Charlotte Gainsbourg, Antichrist, 2009) and male acting (Jamel Debbouze, Samy Naceri, Roschdy Zem, Sami Bouajila and Bernard Blancan, Days of Glory, 2006).

The 2008 rural comedy Bienvenue chez les Ch'tis drew an audience of more than 20 million, the first French film to do so. Its $193 million gross in France puts it just behind Titanic as the most successful film of all time in French theaters.

In the 2000s, several French directors made international productions, often in the action genre. These include Gérard Pirès (Riders, 2002), Pitof (Catwoman, 2004), Jean-François Richet (Assault on Precinct 13, 2005), Florent Emilio Siri (Hostage, 2005), Christophe Gans (Silent Hill, 2006), Mathieu Kassovitz (Babylon A.D., 2008), Louis Leterrier (The Transporter, 2002; Transporter 2, 2005; Olivier Megaton directed Transporter 3, 2008), Alexandre Aja (Mirrors, 2008), and Pierre Morel (Taken, 2009).

Surveying the entire range of French filmmaking today, Tim Palmer calls contemporary cinema in France a kind of eco-system, in which commercial cinema co-exists with artistic radicalism, first-time directors (who make up about 40% of all France's directors each year) mingle with veterans, and there even occasionally emerges a fascinating pop-art hybridity, in which the features of intellectual and mass cinemas are interrelated (as in filmmakers like Valeria Bruni-Tedeschi, Olivier Assayas, Maïwenn, Sophie Fillières, Serge Bozon, and others).

2010s 

One of the most noticed and best reviewed films of 2010 was the drama Of Gods and Men (Des hommes et des dieux), about the assassination of seven monks in Tibhirine, Algeria.  2011 saw the release of The Artist, a silent film shot in black and white by Michel Hazanavicius that reflected on the end of Hollywood's silent era.

French cinema continued its upward trend of earning awards at the Cannes Festival, including the prestigious Grand Prix for Of Gods and Men (2010) and the Jury Prize for Poliss (2011); the Best Director Award for Mathieu Amalric (On Tour, 2010); the Best Actress Award for Juliette Binoche (Certified Copy, 2010); and the Best Actor Award for Jean Dujardin (The Artist, 2011).

In 2011, the film Intouchables became the most watched film in France (including the foreign films). After ten weeks nearly 17.5 million people had seen the film in France, Intouchables was the second most-seen French movie of all-time in France, and the third including foreign movies.

In 2012, with 226 million admissions (US$1,900 million) in the world for French films (582 films released in 84 countries), including 82 million admissions in France (US$700 million), 2012 was the fourth best year since 1985. With 144 million admissions outside France (US$1,200 million), 2012 was the best year since at least 1994 (since Unifrance collects data), and the French cinema reached a market share of 2.95% of worldwide admissions and of 4.86% of worldwide sales. Three films particularly contributed to this record year: Taken 2, The Intouchables and The Artist. In 2012, films shot in French ranked 4th in admissions (145 million) behind films shot in English (more than a billion admissions in the US alone), Hindi (?: no accurate data but estimated at 3 billion for the whole India/Indian languages) and Chinese (275 million in China plus a few million abroad), but above films shot in Korean (115 million admissions in South Korea plus a few millions abroad) and Japanese (102 million admissions in Japan plus a few million abroad, a record since 1973 et its 104 million admissions). French-language movies ranked 2nd in export (outside of French-speaking countries) after films in English. 2012 was also the year French animation studio Mac Guff was acquired by an American studio, Universal Pictures, through its Illumination Entertainment subsidiary. Illumination Mac Guff became the animation studio for some of the top English-language animated movies of the 2010s, including The Lorax and the Despicable Me franchise.

In 2015 French cinema sold 106 million tickets and grossed €600 million outside of the country. The highest-grossing film was Taken 3 (€261.7 million) and the largest territory in admissions was China (14.7 million).

Government support 
As the advent of television threatened the success of cinema, countries were faced with the problem of reviving movie-going. The French cinema market, and more generally the French-speaking market, is smaller than the English-speaking market; one reason being that some major markets, including prominently the United States, are reluctant to generally accept foreign films, especially foreign-language and subtitled productions. As a consequence, French movies have to be amortized on a relatively small market and thus generally have budgets far lower than their American counterparts, ruling out expensive settings and special effects.

The French government has implemented various measures aimed at supporting local film production and movie theaters. The Canal+ TV channel has a broadcast license requiring it to support the production of movies. Some taxes are levied on movies and TV channels for use as subsidies for movie production. Some tax breaks are given for investment in movie productions, as is common elsewhere including in the United States. The sale of DVDs is prohibited for four months after the showing in theaters, so as to ensure some revenue for movie theaters.

Co-production 
The French national and regional governments involve themselves in film production. For example, the award-winning documentary In the Land of the Deaf (Le Pays des sourds) was created by Nicolas Philibert in 1992. The film was co-produced by multinational partners, which reduced the financial risks inherent in the project; and co-production also ensured enhanced distribution opportunities.

  Les Films d'Ici.
  La Sept-cinéma.
  Rhône-Alpes European Cinematographic Centre.
  Canal+.
  Rhône-Alpes région.
  Centre National de la Cinématographie.<ref name="frdiplomatie">France Diplomatie: [http://www.diplomatie.gouv.fr/en/france-priorities_1/documentary_2312/non-commercial-distribution_2313/documentaries_5315/5-films-by-nicolas-philibert_3149/in-the-land-of-the-deaf_3164/index.html In the Land of the Deaf] .</ref>

  Fondation de France.
  Ministry of Foreign and European Affairs (France).
  Rai 3.
  BBC Television.
  Télévision Suisse Romande.

In Anglophone distribution, In the Land of the Deaf was presented in French Sign Language (FSL) and French, with English subtitles and closed captions.

 Festivals 

 Film distribution and production companies 
Notable French film distribution and/or production companies include:
 Ad Vitam
 Alfama Films
 ARP Sélection
 Bac Films
 Diaphana Films
 EuropaCorp
 Gaumont
 Haut et Court
 KMBO
 Le Pacte
 Les Films du Losange
 Mars Films
 MK2
 Pan-Européenne
 Pathé
 Pyramide Distribution
 Rezo Films
 SND Films
 StudioCanal
 UGC
 Wild Bunch

 See also 

List of French actors
List of French directors
List of French-language films
French comedy films
List of highest-grossing films in France
French film awards
New French Extremity
Cinema of the world

 References 

 Further reading 
 Austin, Guy. Contemporary French cinema: an introduction (2nd ed. 2008) excerpt
 Harison, Casey. "The French Revolution on Film: American and French Perspectives." The History Teacher 38.3 (2005): 299-324. online
 Hayward, Susan. French national cinema (Routledge, 2004).
 Lanzoni, Rémi Fournier. French cinema: from its beginnings to the present (A&C Black, 2004).
 Morrey, Douglas. The legacy of the new wave in French cinema (Bloomsbury Academic, 2018).
 Palmer, Tim and Charlie Michael (eds.) (2013). Directory of World Cinema: France, Intellect/University of Chicago Press, London & Chicago. .

 Powrie, Phil. French Cinema in the 1980s: Nostalgia and the Crisis of Masculinity'' (Oxford University Press, 1997).

External links 
 Unifrance.org
 Sacramento French Film Festival
 Biographies and autographs of French cinema stars
 List of French Movies
 French Films
 French Directors 

 
Industry in France
Cultural history of France